George Sydney Hawkins (1808March 15, 1878) was a US Representative from Florida.
Born in Kingston, Ulster County, New York; attended the common schools and was graduated from Columbia University, New York City; studied law; was admitted to the bar and practiced; moved to Florida and settled in Pensacola, Florida; served as captain in the Indian war of 1837; member of the Legislative Council of the Territory of Florida; appointed district attorney in 1841; appointed United States district attorney for the Apalachicola district in Florida in 1842; associate justice of the Florida Supreme Court 1846–1850; elected judge of the circuit court in January 1851; member of the Florida House of Representatives; served in the Florida State Senate; collector of customs for the port of Apalachicola; elected as a Democrat to the Thirty-fifth and Thirty-sixth Congresses and served from March 4, 1857, to January 21, 1861, when he withdrew; judge of the district court under the Confederate Government 1862–1865; commissioned by the legislation of 1877 to prepare a digest of the State laws of Florida; died in Marianna, Florida; interment in St. Luke's Episcopal Cemetery.

References

External links

1808 births
1878 deaths
Columbia University alumni
Democratic Party Florida state senators
Judges of the Confederate States of America
19th-century American judges
Democratic Party members of the Florida House of Representatives
Democratic Party members of the United States House of Representatives from Florida
Politicians from Kingston, New York
Justices of the Florida Supreme Court
Members of the Florida Territorial Legislature
People from Jackson County, Florida
19th-century American politicians
United States Attorneys